Philip Kunia Pahinui (April 22, 1921 – October 13, 1980), known as Gabby Pahinui, was a slack-key guitarist and singer of Hawaiian music.

Born into a struggling family, Gabby was born Charles Kapono Kahahawai Jr. and later hānaied with his brother and one of his sisters to Philip and Emily Pahinui and raised in the impoverished district of Kaka'ako in  Honolulu in the 1920s ("all tin roofs and kinda falling apart"). He took the name Philip Kunia Pahinui. He spent his childhood supporting his family by selling newspapers and shining shoes. He dropped out of school after 5th grade at the Pohukaina School.

Marriage
Gabby married Emily Pulipuli Pahinui in 1938. He was 17 and she was 19. They remained married until his death. They had 12 children, six boys and six girls.

Early career

Gabby landed a gig as a back-up guitarist for Charley "Tiny" Brown.  He quickly mastered the steel guitar (kīkā kila) even learning to read music.  Because most musicians of the time only played in bars, Gabby also formed a drinking habit that stuck with him throughout his life.

At the 1st Annual Seattle Slack Key Guitar Festival, his son, Cyril Pahinui, related a story about how Gabby got his name. In his early career, he played steel guitar with an orchestra. The standard costume for the gig was gabardine pants—hence his name.  

Cyril told another story, from when Gabby was diving for coins thrown from ships coming to the piers (a common youth activity in Kakaako) : "His hair was kinky, so after swimming and diving for coins, the water would just roll off. So everyone started calling him 'Gabardine Hair.' He also took to wearing gabardine pants, reinforcing Gabby as a nickname."

Though a skilled player of the steel guitar (invented in Hawaii before Blues slide guitar), Gabby is most known for his mastery of traditional Hawaiian slack-key guitar (Kī Hō'alu -"key slackened"- downtuned, usually to an open-string chord with low bass notes, then finger-picked) and his beautiful, expressive vocals. Gabby learned slack-key from Herman Keawe whom Gabby acknowledges as being "the greatest slack-key player of all time." Herman, like Gabby, lived in the Kaka'ako area.

In 1946, Gabby made his first recording, "Hi'ilawe," for the Bell Records label. This may be the first record of a Hawaiian song with slack-key guitar and it inspired many local musicians. The following year came "Hula Medley," the first record of a slack-key guitar instrumental. During this period he made two other influential sides for Bell, the vocal "Wai O Ke Aniani" and the instrumental "Key Koalu" (a misspelling of "Kī Hō'alu"), plus another version of "Hi'ilawe" for Aloha Records.

Pahinui's "Hula Medley," recorded in 1947, was inducted into the U.S. National Recording Registry (2011 group of 25) for cultural, historical or aesthetical significance.

Gabby played with many of the great bands and musicians of his time, including Lena Machado and Ray Kinney.  He appeared on Hawaii Calls, a popular international radio show that began in the 1930s.  Eventually, Gabby moved his wife Emily and their children to Waimānalo, Oahu, which had become a popular second home location for many musicians. The all-weekend jam sessions at the Pahinui home were legendary.

Examples of his session work from the late 1950s through the 1960s can be found on the two volumes of Hawaiian Slack Key Guitar (Waikiki Records 319 and 320) and two more LPs titled Kani Ka Pila! Let's Play Music! Volumes 1 and 2 (Hula Records 517, 1966; Hula 531, 1969). These are combo recordings (steel guitar, slack key guitar, uke, bass, vocals, sometimes percussion) made with bandmates such as Atta, Barney, and Norman Isaacs, Charles Kaipo Miller, and a young Peter Moon, and they reflect the style of nightclub music popular around Waikīkī at the time.

A 1961 solo session organized by Hawaii-raised Dave Guard of the Kingston Trio features just Gabby, with bass and 'ukulele backing, doing some of his classic material, including new versions of three of his four 1946–47 tracks. No record company was interested in the material, however, and it was not released until 1978. The final package was Pure Gabby (Hula 567), a two-record set, one LP consisting of the music and the second of an interview conducted by Guard.

Despite his success, Gabby still had financial trouble.  He made ends meet by working for City and County of Honolulu road crews, doing pick and shovel work alongside fellow Hawaiian musician Eddie Kamae.

Later career

The Hawaiian Renaissance of the 1970s launched a cultural reawakening of all things Hawaiian. Gabby played a very important part in the rise of this Hawaiian Cultural Renaissance. First there were the albums recorded through the 1960s with the enormously popular and influential Sons of Hawaii, which he started with 'ukulele virtuoso Eddie Kamae: their self-titled debut album (Hula HS 503, 1961); Music of Old Hawai'i (Hula HS 506, 1964); and Folk Music of Hawai'i (Panini 1001, 1971).

Then, starting in 1972, he made four albums with what came to be called the "Gabby Band." The first album featured Gabby backed by four of his sons plus old friends Leland "Atta" Isaacs and bassist Manuel "Joe Gang" Kupahu, but the group eventually expanded to include Sonny Chillingworth, younger-generation players Peter Moon and Randy Lorenzo, and mainland admirer Ry Cooder. The albums are:

 Gabby (1972; often called "Brown Gabby" or "The Brown Album" because of its sepia cover photo)
 Rabbit Island Music Festival (1973)
 Gabby Pahinui Hawaiian Band, Vol 1 (1975)
 Gabby Pahinui Hawaiian Band, Vol 2 (1976)

Death and legacy

Gabby Pahinui died of a heart attack on October 13, 1980, aged 59.

The Honolulu Star Bulletin Newspaper reported after Pahinui's death that, "The thing about Gabby Pahinui ... was not only that he was an outstanding musician and entertainer, and a central figure – maybe THE central figure – of the Hawaiian Renaissance in the '70s, but that he was an inspiration to others. Thousands of Hawaiian kids learned that they were worthy as a people because of Gabby's example."

Gabby was mentioned in Israel Kamakawiwoʻole's famous performance of "Somewhere Over the Rainbow/What a Wonderful World" on his 1993 Facing Future album. In the opening moments of the song, Kamakawiwo'ole can be heard saying, "'Kay, this one's for Gabby."

Pahinui received the Hawai'i Academy of Recording Artists Lifetime Achievement Award in 1997. He received a second Hawai'i Academy of Recording Arts Lifetime Achievement Award in 2009 for his work as a member of the Sons of Hawaii.

Pahinui was inducted into the Hawaiian Music Hall of Fame in 2002.

Gabby's children are active in the Hawaiian music scene, notably Cyril Pahinui, James "Bla" Pahinui and Martin Pahinui, all of whom played on the Gabby Band recordings and have since become professional musicians. (Philip, who played on the first two "Gabby Band" albums, chose not to pursue music professionally.)

Further reading
"Gabby Pahinui" [interview] in Da Kine Sound: Conversations with People who Create Hawaiian Music, ed. Burl Burlingame and Robert Kamohalu Kasher (1978, Press Pacifica)
Hawaiian Son, James D. Houston with Eddie Kamae (2004, `Ai Pōhaku Press)
The History of the Slack Key Guitar, CD booklet notes by Jay Junker, Harry B. Soria, Jr., and George Winston (1997, Hana Ola Records)

References

External links 

1921 births
1980 deaths
Musicians from Honolulu
Native Hawaiian musicians
Slack-key guitarists
Hawaiian adoptees (hānai)
20th-century American guitarists
Steel guitarists
Guitarists from Hawaii
American male guitarists
20th-century American male musicians